Hayati Fashion Week (HFW) is an annual series of events when modest fashion collections from Nigeria and other African countries are shown to the press and general public. HFW was founded by Fatima Togbe in 2017.

The inaugural event took place in 2017 and was sponsored by the Medicaid Cancer Foundation (MCF). Other sponsors include  Dunes Center, Pandora, Nestle brand Maggi, Vlisco and Arith & Paul.

Hayati Fashion Week was created as a response to a perceived lack of representation of modest fashion on major Nigerian fashion platforms. It has provided designers, models, artists and other businesses in the Nigerian modest fashion industry, a platform to showcase their work, directly. The event features Runway shows, exhibitions, and a networking soiree.

See also
 List of fashion events

References

External links
 Hayati Fashion Week website
 Magazine Website
 Magazine Français website

Fashion weeks
Fashion events in Nigeria